Billy Lawrence (born May 3, 1971, in Boca Raton, Florida) is an American R&B/soul singer-songwriter, record producer and arranger.

Discography

Albums

Singles

References

1971 births
American women singer-songwriters
Living people
Musicians from St. Louis
Singer-songwriters from Missouri
21st-century American singers
21st-century American women